Theodore Roosevelt McKeldin (November 20, 1900August 10, 1974) was an American politician. He was a member of the Republican Party, served as mayor of Baltimore twice, from 1943 to 1947 and again from 1963 to 1967. McKeldin was the 53rd Governor of Maryland from 1951 to 1959.

Early life
McKeldin was born in Baltimore. His father had worked as a stonecutter and later was a Baltimore City police officer. He had 10 other siblings. McKeldin attended the noted academic all-male third oldest public high school in America at  The Baltimore City College at night in the "Evening High School of Baltimore" program by the Baltimore City Public Schools while working as a bank clerk during the day. The City College was then located at the southwest corner of North Howard and West Centre Streets since 1875, then in the late 1910s when McKeldin attended until it moved in 1928. He graduated later from the University of Maryland Law School at the original campus of the University of Maryland in Baltimore in 1925, and passed into the Maryland Bar. Two years later, he began his political ascent when worked as a secretary to Mayor William F. Broening (1870–1953, served two terms as mayor, 1919–1923 and 1927–1931), one of the few Republican mayors of the city. McKeldin was also a vice president of the local chapter of the U.S. Junior Chamber of Commerce.  In 1934, he was a founding member of Santa Claus Anonymous, a charity organization started during the   "Great Depression" of the 1930s to support children in need, showing his early sense of social consciousness.

Political career
McKeldin challenged the Democratic incumbent Mayor of Baltimore, Howard W. Jackson, in the municipal election of 1939, but McKeldin was defeated in the election. He went on challenging incumbent Maryland Governor in the State House three years later - Herbert R. O'Conor in the state election of 1942, and again  was defeated at the polls in this heavily leaning Democratic controlled state.

McKeldin persisted, and he was elected mayor of Baltimore in 1943. As mayor, he oversaw the construction of Friendship Airport, (since renamed Baltimore-Washington International Thurgood Marshall Airport). However, Baltimore saw hard times during this period following the Second World War, with the inner city decaying, ghettos forming, and racial prejudice still present in government policy-making. McKeldin ran a second time for governor in 1946, challenging William Preston Lane Jr., but was defeated yet again.

McKeldin ran for governor a third time in 1950, successfully defeating Lane in a rematch. As governor, McKeldin endeavored to improve the state highway system, namely by establishing the Baltimore Beltway (now I-695), the Capital Beltway (I-495), and the John Hanson Highway (US 50 between Washington, D.C. and the state capital at Annapolis). He was a staunch supporter of interstate cooperation, saying once: "I rode by train over several state borders. I carried no passports. No one asked me to identify myself. No one had the right to. This is America." He was also an advocate for civil rights for African Americans, as well as a supporter of Israel and was awarded the Sidney Hollander Award.

In 1952 McKeldin was a major figure in the moderate Republicans of the East Coast who were instrumental in gaining the Republican nomination for president for former five-star  General and World War II Commander in Europe and later briefly president of Columbia University in New York City - Dwight D. Eisenhower of Kansas. Speaking in the stentorian tones that were common for the time, McKeldin delivered the principal nominating speech for the former general at the July 1952 Republican National Convention in Chicago.

In 1954, he was re-elected against Democratic nominee former "Terrapins" football player and coach becoming University of Maryland at College Park President Harry C."Curley" Byrd by 54.46% to 45.54% who had attracted white segregationist support for his resistance to Black student enrollment at UMD. After his second term in Government House, McKeldin retired in 1959 from the governorship and returned to his law practice in Baltimore, succeeded by lower Eastern Shore Democrat J. Millard Tawes of Crisfield. Four years later in 1963, he returned to public service after again being elected  to a second non-consecutive term once again as mayor of his beloved hometown of Baltimore, focusing on the urban renewal of the Baltimore Inner Harbor. In 1964, McKeldin decided to support Democratic candidate Lyndon B. Johnson over conservative Republican Barry M. Goldwater in the presidential election due to Goldwater's voting against the Civil Rights Act of 1964.He saw the city council vote to condemn 700 homes of the Rosemont neighborhood in 1966 to build the East West Expressway "Highway to nowhere" that he started as a project with Robert Moses in 1941. McKeldin served his second term as mayor until 1967.

To date, McKeldin is the last Republican mayor of Baltimore; indeed, he is the last Republican mayoral candidate to win even 25 percent of the vote. He is the first of only two Republican governors in Maryland to be re-elected, the other being Larry Hogan, who was reelected in 2018.

Personal
Theodore McKeldin was born in Baltimore, Maryland, attending Maryland public schools and later graduating from Baltimore City College. He furthered his education by earning his law degree from the University of Maryland School of Law in 1925 and with some graduate work at Johns Hopkins University. McKeldin married Honolulu Claire Manzer on October 17, 1924. They had two children, Theodore Jr. and Clara.

He died on August 10, 1974, and is buried in Greenmount Cemetery.

Dedications
 McKeldin Center at Morgan State University 
 McKeldin Library and McKeldin Mall at the University of Maryland, College Park 
 Theodore McKeldin Gymnasium at Bowie State University 
McKeldin Building at Springfield Hospital Center
McKeldin Beltway, though still widely known as the Baltimore Beltway or Interstate 695
McKeldin Area, Patapsco Valley State Park 
McKeldin Planetarium at St. John's College

References

General references
Theodore R. McKeldin biography from the Maryland State Archives. Accessed Oct 25, 2004.
Theodore R. McKeldin papers, at University of Maryland Libraries.

External links
 
 

1900 births
1974 deaths
20th-century American politicians
Activists for African-American civil rights
Republican Party governors of Maryland
Mayors of Baltimore
Politicians from Baltimore
University of Maryland Francis King Carey School of Law alumni
Baltimore City College alumni
20th-century American Episcopalians